David Noroña, usually simplified as David Norona, (born December 14, 1972) is a Cuban American actor and director who has appeared in films including Though None Go with Me, TV series including The Mentalist and Jack Ryan, and various theatre works. He is co-creator and co-lyricist for Paradise Lost: Shadows and Wings and has directed two short films.

Biography
David Noroña was born in Hialeah, Florida to Cuban parents Jorge Noroña and Edith Iglesias. He began his acting career at Coral Gables Senior High School in Coral Gables, Florida with roles in The Sound of Music and The Fantasticks. After receiving his BFA with honors from Carnegie Mellon University, he set off for New York City where he made his Broadway debut in Love! Valour! Compassion!.

He has acted in films, like shorts Maggie Moore and Soledad, and has appeared in many television series, including Six Feet Under, Inconceivable, Mister Sterling and Lipstick Jungle.

Noroña has also landed roles on theatre stages. He played role of Irving Berlin in The Tin Pan Alley Rag both on the Pasadena Playhouse theatre and the Coconut Grove Playhouse. The role landed him a nomination at the Los Angeles Ovation Award. He also had the lead role of Frankie Valli in the original run of Jersey Boys on La Jolla Playhouse in San Diego, California. On January 24, 2005, he received the prize for "Lead Performance in a Musical, Male" for his role during the San Diego Theatre Critics Circle 2004 awards He also played the role of George in a Latin remake of Of Mice and Men at the Pasadena Playhouse.

David Noroña is co-writer and co-lyricist of Paradise Lost: Shadows and Wings, a groundbreaking piece that combined classical singing with ambient, trance and dance electronica. It received rave reviews, critical acclaim and nominations to ten Ovation Awards including "Best New Musical".

Personal life
He is married with three sons and a daughter, and resides in Redding, CA.

Works

Film
Feature
1993: Money for Nothing as US Air Ticket Clerk
1996: Mrs. Santa Claus as Marcello Damaroco
1997: Twisted as Angel
2000: The Expendables as Ramone
2000: Alligator Alley as Jay Taylor
2001: Bailey's Mistake as Father Miguel
2006: Though None Go with Me as Will Bishop
2011: A Crush on You as Gabe

Short
2000: Maggie Moore as Alex
2000: Soledad

Television
(Selective. For a comprehensive list, see IMDb)
2000: Popular as Nurse Dan Murphy (3 episodes) 
2001–2002: Six Feet Under as Gary Deitman (8 episodes)
2003: Monk as Lt. Plato (1 episode - "Mr. Monk Goes to Mexico") (as David Noroña)
2003: Mister Sterling as Leon Montero (10 episodes)
2005: Inconceivable as Scott García (9 episodes)
2005: CSI: Miami as Joshua Greenfield (1 episode)
2007: In Case of Emergency as Paul (4 episodes)
2007: Ugly Betty as Tyler Blake (1 episode)
2008–2009: Lipstick Jungle as Salvador Rosa (18 episodes)
2009: Bones as Derek DaFonte (1 episode)
2010: The Defenders as ADA Andrew Gomez  (2 episodes)
2011–2014: The Mentalist as D.D.A. Osvaldo Ardiles (8 episodes)
2012: One Tree Hill as Dr. Alvarez (6 episodes)
2016: Designated Survivor as Governor Rivera (1 episode)
2017–2018: The Gifted as Senator Matthew Montez (3 episodes)
2019: Jack Ryan as José Marzan (6 episodes)

Theatre
As writer/lyricist
Paradise Lost: Shadows and Wings (co-creator and co-lyricist of musical)

As actor

 1995: Love! Valour! Compassion! (Understudy: David Noroña [Bobby Brahms, Ramon Fornos])
2004: Jersey Boys as Frankie Valli (lead role - original run on La Jolla Playhouse in San Diego, California)
2008: Of Mice and Men as George
2009: The Tin Pan Alley Rag as Irving Berlin

References

External links
 
 
David Noroña at the Internet Broadway Database

1972 births
Living people
American male stage actors
American male television actors
American male film actors
Hispanic and Latino American male actors
Carnegie Mellon University College of Fine Arts alumni
American entertainers of Cuban descent